33-Manglaur Legislative Assembly constituency is one of the seventy electoral Uttarakhand Legislative Assembly constituencies of Uttarakhand state in India. It includes Manglaur area of Haridwar District.

Manglaur Legislative Assembly constituency is a part of Haridwar (Lok Sabha constituency).

Members of Legislative Assembly

Election results

2022

See also
 Haridwar (Lok Sabha constituency)

References

External link
  
 http://eci.nic.in/eci_main/CurrentElections/CONSOLIDATED_ORDER%20_ECI%20.pdf
 http://ceo.uk.gov.in/files/Election2012/RESULTS_2012_Uttarakhand_State.pdf

Haridwar
Assembly constituencies of Uttarakhand
2002 establishments in Uttarakhand
Constituencies established in 2002